Magallanes National Reserve is a national reserve of southern Chile's Magallanes and Antártica Chilena Region. It was created on February 13, 1932.

References

External links

National reserves of Chile
Protected areas of Magallanes Region
Protected areas established in 1932
1932 establishments in Chile